The Wichita Art Museum is an art museum located in Wichita, Kansas, United States.

The museum was established in 1915, when Louise Caldwell Murdock’s Will which created a trust to start the Roland P. Murdock Collection of art in memory of her husband. The trust would purchase art for the City of Wichita by “American painters, potters, sculptors, and textile weavers.” The collection includes works by Mary Cassatt, Arthur G. Dove, Thomas Eakins, Robert Henri, Douglas Abdell, Winslow Homer, Edward Hopper, Yasuo Kuniyoshi, John Marin, Paul Meltsner, Horace Pippin, Maurice Prendergast, Albert Pinkham Ryder and Charles Sheeler. The Museum's lobby features a ceiling and chandelier made by Dale Chihuly.

The museum opened in 1935 with art borrowed from other museums. The first work in the Murdock Collection was purchased in 1939. Mrs. Murdock's friend, Elizabeth Stubblefield Navas, selected and purchased works of American art for the Murdock Collection until 1962. The building was enlarged with a new lobby and two new wings in 1963. In 1964, a foundation was established for the purpose of raising funds for new acquisitions. In the 1970s, the city built a new and larger climate controlled facility. The current building was designed by Edward Larrabee Barnes.

Tera Hedrick, an art historian and Wichita East High School graduate, was hired as curator in 2017 after serving in an interim role. 

In January 2020, the museum announced that it would begin renovation on its main entrance and lobby.

Gallery

References

External links
 Wichita Art Museum website

Art museums established in 1935
Museums in Wichita, Kansas
Art museums and galleries in Kansas
Museums of American art
1935 establishments in Kansas